Larches (Larix species) are used as food plants by the caterpillars of a number of Lepidoptera species, including:

Monophagous
Species which feed exclusively on Larix

 Coleophoridae
 Several Coleophora case-bearer species:
C. laricella (larch casebearer) – only on European larch (L. decidua)
 C. obducta
 C. sibiricella – only on European larch (L. decidua)
 Gelechiidae
 Chionodes tragicella

Polyphagous
Species which feed on Larix and other plants

 Geometridae
 Bupalus piniaria (bordered white)
 Ectropis crepuscularia (engrailed)
 Epirrita autumnata (autumnal moth)
 Erannis defoliaria (mottled umber)
 Eupithecia subfuscata (grey pug)
 Hemithea aestivaria (common emerald)
 Odontopera bidentata (scalloped hazel)
 Operophtera brumata (winter moth) – recorded on European larch (L. decidua)
 Noctuidae
 Melanchra persicariae (dot moth)
 Panolis flammea (pine beauty)
 Thaumetopoeidae
 Thaumetopoea pityocampa (pine processionary)
 Tortricidae
 Cydia illutana – recorded on European larch (L. decidua), Dahurian larch (L. gmelinii) and Siberian larch (L. sibirica) cone scales

References

External links 

Larix
+Lepidoptera